John Henderson (born 22 September 1941 in Johnshaven, Scotland), is a Scottish footballer who played as an inside right in the English Football League.

After spells in the Football League with Charlton Athletic, Exeter City and Doncaster Rovers Henderson joined semi-professional Kidderminster Harriers from Chesterfield in the summer of 1966, scoring 141 goals in 331 games. Highlights of his career with the Hariers were a 1st Round FA Cup tie with Brighton and Hove Albion, and winning the West Midland League in 1968–69.

Retiring in 1973 the Scot settled in Kidderminster with his family.

External links

1941 births
Living people
Scottish footballers
Charlton Athletic F.C. players
Exeter City F.C. players
Doncaster Rovers F.C. players
Chesterfield F.C. players
Kidderminster Harriers F.C. players
English Football League players
Association football midfielders